is a former Japanese football player.

Playing career
Ishibashi was born in Saitama Prefecture on May 14, 1981. He joined the Japan Football League (JFL) club Yokohama FC in 2000. Yokohama FC won the championship in 2000 and was promoted to the J2 League. However he did not play much over the next two seasons. In 2002, he moved to the J2 club Sagan Tosu. Although he played as substitute midfielder in 2002, he did not play much in 2003. In August 2003, he moved to the JFL club ALO's Hokuriku. He became a regular player and played often. He retired at the end of the 2006 season.

Club statistics

References

External links

library.footballjapan.jp

1981 births
Living people
Association football people from Saitama Prefecture
Japanese footballers
J2 League players
Japan Football League players
Yokohama FC players
Sagan Tosu players
Kataller Toyama players
Association football midfielders